Witheridge is a village and civil parish in the North Devon district of Devon, England. In 2001 the population of the parish was 1162, reducing slightly to 1,158 at the 2011 Census.  An electoral ward with the same name exists. The population at the above census was 2,313. Its name may be derived from the Old English for "Weather Ridge", which would fit with the village's somewhat exposed situation.

Situated almost equidistant from Dartmoor and Exmoor, the village has earned the nickname the Gateway to the Two Moors Way. Butcher FJP Maunder established his business in the village in 1879, which taken over by his son became local butchers chain Lloyd Maunder. The village is home to two shops, a pub, restaurant and a cafe. There is also the home to Mid Devon Medical Practice. It is also home to a Gothic-style church, built circa 1500, and restored in 1841 and 1884. The stone pulpit located in the church is one of just 70 medieval stone pulpits in England.

The village is twinned with Cambremer, France, and the two villages have annual exchange trips (although not solely for students).

Sport and leisure
Witheridge has a Non-League football club Witheridge F.C. who play in the South West Peninsula League which is at step 6 of the National League System as well as a Reserve side who play in Division 1 of the Devon and Exeter Football League. Both sides play their home games at Edge Down Park.
The St John's Fair takes place annually and shows the wonderful community spirit in this English village.

Witheridge also has a well established Taekwondo club.

Notable residents
Witheridge is the birthplace of Mary Baker (née Willcocks), a noted impostor who went by the name "Princess Caraboo" from a fictional far off island kingdom.

Frank and Mary Housam have represented Witheridge in town crier competitions all over the world, winning trophies in Canada, Australia and the US, and represented Witheridge at the World Town Crier Championships in Maryborough City, Australia.<ref>

References

External links

Villages in Devon